Timotheus "Tim" Bernardus Steens (born 13 December 1955) is a retired Dutch field hockey player, who earned a total number of 162 caps, scoring 12 goals for the Netherlands national field hockey team in the 1970s and 1980s.

He played for the Dutch hockey team HC Klein Zwitserland.  He was a member of the bronze medal-winning Dutch team at the 1988 Summer Olympics in Seoul. Steens is the younger brother of Dutch field hockey Olympian Ron Steens.

References

External links
 
 Tim Steens Olympic statistics at databaseolympics.com
Profile

Living people
1955 births
Dutch male field hockey players
Male field hockey midfielders
Male field hockey forwards
Olympic field hockey players of the Netherlands
Field hockey players at the 1976 Summer Olympics
Field hockey players at the 1988 Summer Olympics
Olympic bronze medalists for the Netherlands
Sportspeople from Rotterdam
Olympic medalists in field hockey
Medalists at the 1988 Summer Olympics
HC Klein Zwitserland players
1978 Men's Hockey World Cup players
20th-century Dutch people